National Route 237 is a national highway of Japan connecting Asahikawa, Hokkaidō and Urakawa, Hokkaidō in Japan, with a total length of 260 km (161.56 mi).

References

National highways in Japan
Roads in Hokkaido